Huwag Ka Lang Mawawala (International title: Against All Odds / ) is a 2013 Philippine melodrama television series aired on ABS-CBN and worldwide on The Filipino Channel from June 17, 2013 to August 23, 2013, replacing Ina, Kapatid, Anak and was replaced by Got to Believe. It served as a comeback for renowned Pinoy soap opera actress Judy Ann Santos, together with Sam Milby and KC Concepcion in their first antagonist roles. It is a dark melodrama involving women fighting adversity in life and marriage.

The series is streaming online on YouTube.

Overview
Anessa Panaligan is a strong woman and a loving daughter who would do everything for the sake of her family. Amidst all the trials that she is facing, Anessa will meet and fall in love with Eros Diomedes, a rich young man who will turn her life into a nightmare.

Cast and characters

Main cast
 Judy Ann Santos as Anessa Panaligan-Diomedes / Angela Balaguer
 Sam Milby as Eros Diomedes
 KC Concepcion as Alexis G. Tiotangco
 John Estrada as Alejo Apostol
 Tirso Cruz III as Romulos Diomedes
 Coney Reyes as Helena Diomedes
 Mylene Dizon as Athena Apostol
 Susan Africa as Demetria Panaligan
 Empress as Iris Diomedes
 Joseph Marco as Leandros Panaligan

Supporting cast
 Bryan Termulo as Victor Guevarra
 Matet de Leon as Nancy Guevarra
 Ogie Diaz as Roger Alegria
 Bing Davao as Ernesto Martinez
 Johnny Revilla as Hector Tiotangco
 Cheska Iñigo as Kara Tiotangco
 Lui Manansala as Gloria
 Michael Conan as Bernard
 Marvin Yap as Elmo
 Josh Ivan Morales as Rocky
 Miguel Vergara as Emman "JR" P. Diomedes
 Marco Antonio Masa as Peter T. Diomedes

Guest cast
 AJ Dee as Edgar
 Mico Palanca as Ramon
 Via Antonio as Barbara
 Bernard Palanca as Greg
 Dexie Daulat as Angela
 Hiyasmin Neri as young Maria
 Ron Morales as young Romulos
 Dianne Medina as young Helena
 Sophia Ysm as young Eva

Special participation
 Amalia Fuentes as Dr. Maria Balaguer
 Gretchen Barretto as Atty. Eva Custodio
 Lito Pimentel as Dario Panaligan

Reception
Huwag Ka Lang Mawawala dominated its 8:30–9:15pm timeslot. Although it moved to a later timeslot to give way for Muling Buksan ang Puso, it still dominates its new timeslot (9:15–10:00pm).

The series ranked 11th in the Top 15 programs from January to December 2013 based on year round data from Kantar Media Philippines with an average rating of 25.9%.

Cancellation
Huwag Ka Lang Mawawala was supposed to be extended due to high ratings and positive feedbacks. Unfortunately, the show's extension is later cancelled due to the combined requests of Koreanovela fans and the supporters of That Winter, the Wind Blows, followed by Santos' decision to finish her show immediately to give way for Got to Believe.

See also
List of programs broadcast by ABS-CBN
List of telenovelas of ABS-CBN

References

External links 
 

ABS-CBN drama series
2013 Philippine television series debuts
2013 Philippine television series endings
Philippine melodrama television series
Philippine action television series
Television series about revenge
Philippine romance television series
Television series by Dreamscape Entertainment Television
Filipino-language television shows
Television shows set in the Philippines